Dębiny  is a village in the administrative district of Gmina Przysucha, within Przysucha County, Masovian Voivodeship, in east-central Poland.

In 2005 the village had a population of 210.

References

Villages in Przysucha County